Jennifer Streiffer Mascaro (born May 25, 1978) is an American former soccer player who played as a midfielder, making four appearances for the United States women's national team. She is also an anthropologist.

Career
Mascaro played for the Baton Rouge Bulldogs in high school, where she was three-time Louisiana High School Player of the Year and named to the All-State team in all four seasons. She helped the team to win state titles in her sophomore and junior years, and was a Parade and NSCAA All-American. She also was selected to All-State for cross country and track in high school. In college, she played for the Notre Dame Fighting Irish from 1996 to 1999. In total, she scored 70 goals and recorded 71 assists in 100 appearances for the Fighting Irish. She was an NSCAA Third-Team All-American in 1996 and 1999, and was included in the Soccer America All-Freshman Team in 1996. She was also included in the NCAA College Cup All-Tournament Team in 1996, 1997, and 1999. She was also included in the CoSIDA Academic All-America First Team in 1997 and Second Team in 1998. In 1999, she was named Big East Championship Most Outstanding Player, and later that year was awarded an NCAA Postgraduate Scholarship. She is ranked second in career points (goals and assists) at the school, with 211, and points per match, with 2.11.

In club soccer, Mascaro played for the San Diego Spirit from 2001 to 2002, where she scored 3 goals and recorded 6 assists in 28 appearances.

After graduating high school, Mascaro was included as an alternate player in the United States squad for the inaugural women's soccer tournament at the 1996 Summer Olympics in Atlanta. She was part of the under-20 national team which won the 1997 Nordic Cup. She made her international debut for the United States on February 24, 1999 in a friendly match against Finland. In total, she made four appearances for the U.S. and scored two goals, earning her final cap on January 13, 2000 in the 2000 Australia Cup against Australia, winning the tournament.

Personal life
Mascaro was born in Metairie, Louisiana, though Baton Rouge is her hometown. She married Nathan Mascaro in 1999. She graduated from the University of Notre Dame in 2000 with bachelor's degrees in pre-professional studies and anthropology. In 2011, she earned a PhD in anthropology from Emory University.

Career statistics

International

International goals

Honors
United States
 Australia Cup: 2000

References

External links
 Notre Dame player profile

1978 births
Living people
People from Metairie, Louisiana
Soccer players from Louisiana
American women's soccer players
United States women's under-20 international soccer players
United States women's international soccer players
Women's association football midfielders
Baton Rouge Magnet High School alumni
Notre Dame Fighting Irish women's soccer players
San Diego Spirit players
Women's United Soccer Association players
Emory University alumni